was a Japanese samurai of the late Edo period, and an Imperial Japanese Army general of the early Meiji era.

Biography
His sword style was Ko-jigen-ryū, a branch of the high-speed Jigen-ryū . Kirino's activities during the early to mid-1860s largely centered on Kyoto. During the Boshin War, as a senior commander of Satsuma forces, he was a high-ranking officer of the new Imperial Army. It was Kirino who was the representative of the imperial army at the surrender of Wakamatsu Castle, where he received the petition for surrender from Matsudaira Katamori, the lord of Aizu.

Kirino became a brigadier general in the early years of the Imperial Japanese Army. However, he joined the forces of Saigō Takamori during the Satsuma Rebellion, taking part in the march northward to Kumamoto. A lover of French Eau de Cologne, Kirino wore it even during his last battle at Shiroyama. Kirino remained with Saigō until the end, and was killed at the end of the rebellion. He was buried alongside Saigō Takamori, Beppu Shinsuke, Katsura Hisatake, Murata Shinpachi, Shinohara Kunimoto, and Oyama Tsunayoshi among others at the Nanshu Cemetery, Kagoshima Prefecture, Japan.

As seen in several contemporary ukiyo-e woodblock prints depicting the uprising, she also joined in its march to lead the women auxiliary troops. Unlike her husband, she survived, and lived until 1920.

Cultural references
Kirino appears as a character in the history-themed  Getsumei Seiki, by Kenji Morita.  Kirino also appears as the Army Commander in the manga RED: Livin' on The Edge, by Kenichi Muraeda.

References

External links

 Photos of the graves of the Satsuma Rebellion leaders, including Kirino (3 October 2007)

Further reading
 Nagano Ōgaku 長野桜岳 (1972). Kirino Toshiaki 桐野利秋. Tokyo: Shin Jinbutsu Ōraisha.

1838 births
1877 deaths
Samurai
People from Kagoshima
Japanese generals
Meiji Restoration
Japanese swordfighters
Boshin War
People from Satsuma Domain
People of the Boshin War
Shimazu retainers
People killed in the Satsuma Rebellion